Ajorlu (also Romanized as Ājorlū, Ajarlu, and Ājerlū) is a village in Pish Khowr Rural District, Pish Khowr District, Famenin County, Hamadan Province, Iran. At the 2006 census, its population was 304, in 84 families.

References 

Populated places in Famenin County